This is a partial list of compositions by English composer Julius Harrison (1885–1963).

Operetta
 A Fantasy of Flowers (1944); libretto by Muriel Levy

Orchestral
 Ballade for string orchestra (1902)
 Prelude Music for string orchestra and piano (or harp), Op.16 (1912); original for harp and string quartet
 Variations on "Down Among the Dead Men" (1912)
 Widdicombe Fair, Humoreske for string orchestra, Op.22 (1916); original for string quartet
 Rapunzel (1917); tone poem 
 Worcestershire Suite (1918); original for piano
 Romance, a Song of Adoration (1930); for orchestra
 Cornish Holiday Sketches for string orchestra (1935)
 Autumn Landscape for string orchestra (1937); premiered by the BBC Symphony Orchestra in February 1937
 Troubadour Suite for string orchestra, harp (or piano) and optional horns (1944)
     The King of Navarre's Chanson
     The Marriage of Yolande
     Song of Spring
     Dancing Song

Concertante
 Bredon Hill, Rhapsody for violin and orchestra (1941)

Chamber music
 Prelude Music, Quintet in G major for harp and string quartet, Op.16 (1912); also for string orchestra and piano (or harp)
 Scaramouche for violin and piano (1915)
 Pensée fugitive for violin and piano (1915)
 Widdicombe Fair, Humoreske for string quartet, Op.22 (1916); also for string orchestra
 Fanfare for a Masked Ball for 4 trumpets (1921)
 Sonata in C minor for viola and piano (1945)
 String Quartet

Organ
 Paean and Tonus Peregrinus: Homage to Cesar Franck
 Paean (1913)
 Supplication / Gloria in Excelsis /  Canzone (1913)

Piano
 Rhapsody, Intermezzo and Capriccio (1903)
 Musette for voice and piano (1907)
 Barcarolle (1917)
 Worcestershire Suite (1918); also orchestrated
     The Shrawley Round
     Redstone Rock
     Pershore Plums
     The Ledbury Parson
 The Pixie Man, Suite (1920)
 Silver Bells and Cockle Shells (1920)
 Five English Songs (1921)
 Severn Country, Suite (1928)
     Dance in the Cherry Orchard (Ribbesford)
     Twilight on the River (Bewdley)
     Far Forest
 Philomel (1938)
 Town and Country (1948)
 Wayside Fancies, Suite (1948)
     March Humoresque
     An Old Legend
     Columbine's Waltz
     Summer Breeze
     The Jolly Huntsman
 Autumn Days (1952)
 Burlesque (1952)
 Caprice (1952)
 High Summer (1952)
 Mr. Alberti Takes a Stroll (1952)
 Outdoor Song: At the fair (1952)
 Spring in the Air (1952)
 The Rival Fourth Finger (1952)
 Valse-Serenade (1952)

Vocal
 Six Short Songs for medium voice and piano (1907)
 Bonny Blue-cap for medium voice and piano (1908); words by Sir Walter Scott
 Rosalys for soprano voices and orchestra (1912); words by Dante Gabriel Rossetti
 Songs of Fancy, 4 Songs (1913); words by P. Ashbrooke
     Little Untrodden Paths
     Oh, Little Mist from the Sea
     Silent Trees
     At Daybreak
 Four Songs of Chivalry for voice and piano (1915); words by William Morris
     Sir Giles' War Song
     Guendolen
     The Eve of Crecy
     The Gilliflower of Gold
 Three Eastern Love Songs for voice and piano (1915); words by Edward Teschemacher
     You Bring Me Pearls
     O Jewel of the Deep Blue Sea
     Caravan of Love
 The Wanderer's Song (1915); words by George Reston Malloch
 Four Narratives from the Ancient Chinese for medium voice and piano (1917)
     The Soldier
     The Last Revel
     There Was a King of Liang
     The Recruiting Sergeant
 Three Sonnets from Boccaccio for high voice and piano (1919); words by Giovanni Boccaccio
 On the Beach at Otahai (1920); words by E. J. Brady
 Three Songs (1921–1927)
     Merciless Beauty; words by Geoffrey Chaucer
     The Escape from Love; words by Geoffrey Chaucer
     A Lament; words by Sir Thomas Wyatt
 I Know a Bank for soprano or tenor and piano (1928); words from A Midsummer Night's Dream by William Shakespeare
 Four Cavalier Tunes for tenor or baritone and piano (1930); words by Robert Browning
     Boot, Saddle, To Horse and Away
     King Charles
     Marching Along
 Rhapsody for tenor or baritone voice and orchestra (1932); words by Walt Whitman
 Sea Winds for voice and piano (1932); words by Paul Askew
 Memory Island for baritone and piano (1936); words by Paul Askew
 Philomel for voice and piano (1938); words from A Midsummer Night's Dream by William Shakespeare
 Four Songs from Twelfth Night for high voice and piano (1948); words from Twelfth Night by William Shakespeare
     Come Away Death
     Jolly Robin
     O Mistress Mine
     Clown's Song

Choral
 Cleopatra, Dramatic Poem (Cantata) for soli (soprano, mezzo-soprano, contralto, tenor), chorus and orchestra (1908); performed at the Norwich Festival in 1908
 Harvest Cantata for soprano (or tenor) and contralto (or baritone) soli, chorus and piano or organ (1910); words by Rose Dafforne Betjemann
 Christmas Cantata for soli and chorus (1911); words by Rose Dafforne Betjemann
 Viking Song, Part-song for male chorus and pianoforte or orchestra (1911); words by Fred Adlington
 Open Thy Gates, Introit Anthem for mixed chorus (with organ ad libitum) (1913); words by Robert Herrick
 Prevent Us, O Lord, Anthem for mixed chorus and organ (1914)
 Blows the Wind To-day for mixed chorus a cappella (1915); words by Robert Louis Stevenson
 In the Forest for mixed chorus a cappella (1913); words by Heinrich Heine; translation by Francis Hueffer
 Requiem for Archangels for SATB choir or chorus (1919)
 In Celia's Face for chorus (composed prior to 1921); poem by Thomas Carew
 Easter Carol for female chorus and piano (1921); words by Frederick Elliott
 The Little Men for female chorus (1921); words by William Allingham
 Pastoral for chorus (composed by 1922)
 The Blessed Damozel for female chorus a cappella (1928); words by Dante Gabriel Rossetti
 I Love the Jocund Dance for a capella SSA chorus (1929); poem by William Blake
 A Sunny Shaft, Part Song for female chorus and piano (1929); words by Samuel Taylor Coleridge
 Merry Miller, Folk-jingle for mixed chorus a cappella (1932); words by Helen Taylor
 Song of the Plough for mixed-voice chorus (1932); words from the first Georgic of Virgil, tr. James Rhoades
 Magnifcat and Nunc dimittis for unison voices and organ (1941)
 The Wild Huntsman, Fantasia for male chorus a cappella (1946)
 The Dark Forest, Part-song for mixed chorus a cappella (1947); words by Edward Thomas
 Mass in C for solo voices, chorus, organ and orchestra (1936–1947); premiered at Stoke-on-Trent in 1948; twice broadcast in 1952 and 1955
 Missa liturgica for mixed chorus a cappella (1950)
 Psalm C (Psalm 100) for mixed chorus and organ (1953)
 Requiem Mass for soprano, alto, tenor and bass soli, mixed chorus and orchestra (1948–1957); first performed in 1957 at the Worcester Three Choirs Festival

Unfinished opera
The Canterbury Pilgrims. The opera's Introduction and Love Duet were premiered in 1923, but the opera was never completed.

Arrangements
Harrison's many arrangements include versions of Weber's Invitation to the Dance, sundry Schubert songs (entitled Winter and Spring) and a "concert version" of Smetana's The Bartered Bride all for mixed chorus.

References

Harrison, Julius